Mashimaro (마시마로) or Yeopki Tokki (엽기토끼 "bizarre rabbit") in Korean and 流氓兔 ("hoodlum rabbit") in Chinese is a South Korean fictional character who resembles a fat rabbit, created by Kim Jae In (김재인). He debuted in a series of Flash animations (mostly without any dialogue, although the occasional word of Korean or English is present) on the internet. Mashimaro is far more often seen in merchandise, similar to Hello Kitty. (Mashimaro would in fact be best described as Korea's answer to Sanrio.) Mashimaro merchandise can be found on the internet and in Korean communities around the world.

The original Mashimaro cartoons are full of toilet humour, and some of this is also to be found in the merchandise. Mashimaro himself is often portrayed with a plunger stuck to his head. 

When this character was first designed, directors decided to not to use him because they thought 'cartoon characters must have big eyes and positive attitudes,’ and Mashimaro has razor thin eyes and too pessimistic attitude. So the creator Kim Jae made a series of flash animations on the Internet cartoon site and people loved it. The directors then changed their mind about Mashimaro and he became the first Korean hit character. Some years later, the company began to professionally market Mashimaro.

Mashimaro also has a look-alike, Chocomaro, who is brown. Chocomaro appears in two parodies of "Mashimaro" Episodes, including Episodes 2 and 3. Chocomaro tries to do what Mashimaro would normally do in these episodes, but always messes them up and ends up getting hurt. It is unknown exactly what relationship Chocomaro shares with Mashimaro, but most believe that he is the brother of Mashimaro.

The name "Mashimaro" came from the creator's niece/nephew mispronouncing the word "marshmallow" and this character was modeled after the creator's nephew.

A Chinese-Korean animated series based on the character was created in 2018. In 2020, it was announced that a live action movie Mashimaro would be produced. The movie was released on April 6,2022, and was titled "Detective Mashimaro"

See also
Contemporary culture of South Korea

References

External links
Official Site
AsiaFinest MashiMaro

South Korean animation
Fictional rabbits and hares
Fictional bullies
Fictional characters introduced in 2000
Chinese animated television series
2010s South Korean animated television series
2018 South Korean television series debuts